Giacinto is a masculine Italian given name. Notable people with the name include:

Giacinto Achilli (1803–1860), Italian Roman Catholic discharged from the priesthood for sexual misconduct
Giacinto Allegrini (born 1989), Italian professional football player
Giulio Giacinto Avellino (1645–1700), Italian painter of the Baroque period
Giacinto Bellini (17th century) was an Italian painter active in the Baroque period
Giacinto Bobone (c. 1106 – 1198), later Pope Celestine III
Giacinto Bosco (1905–1997), Italian jurist, academic and politician
Giacinto Brandi (1621–1691), Italian painter of the Baroque era
Giacinto Calandrucci (1646–1707), Italian painter of the Baroque period
Giacinto Cestoni (1637–1718), Italian naturalist
Giacinto Andrea Cicognini (1606–1651), Italian playwright and librettist
Giacinto Collegno (1793–1856), Italian patriot of the Risorgimento period
Giacinto De Cassan, former Italian cross-country skier
Giacinto de Popoli (died 1682), Italian painter of the Baroque period
Giacinto Facchetti (1942–2006), Italian football player
Giacinto Garofalini (1661–1723), Italian painter of the Baroque period
Giacinto Geronimo de Espinosa (1600–1680), Spanish painter of the Baroque period
Giacinto Ghia (1887–1944), Italian automobile coachbuilder, founder of Carrozzeria Ghia
Giacinto Gigante (1806–1876), Italian painter
Giacinto Gimignani (1606–1681), Italian painter during the Baroque period
Giacinto Marras (1810–1883), singer and musical composer
Giacinto Menotti Serrati (1874–1926), Italian communist politician
Giacinto Morera (1856–1909), Italian mathematician
Giacinto Prandelli (1914–2010), Italian operatic tenor
Giacinto Santambrogio (1945–2012), Italian professional road bicycle racer
Giacinto Scelsi (1905–1988), Italian composer who also wrote surrealist poetry in French
Giacinto Scoles (born 1935), European and North American chemist and physicist
Giacinto Sertorelli (1914–1938), Italian alpine skier
Giacinto Placido Zurla (1769–1843), Italian clergyman, Cardinal Vicar of Rome

Italian masculine given names